Centenero is a locality located in the municipality of Las Peñas de Riglos, in Huesca province, Aragon, Spain. As of 2020, it has a population of 11.

Geography 
Centenero is located 60km north-northwest of Huesca.

References

Populated places in the Province of Huesca